Bitter Sweet is a 1940 American Technicolor musical film directed by W. S. Van Dyke, based on the operetta Bitter Sweet by Noël Coward. It was nominated for two Academy Awards, one for Best Cinematography and the other for Best Art Direction by Cedric Gibbons and John S. Detlie.

The film is based on Coward's stage operetta, which was a hit in 1929 in London. It was filmed twice, first in 1933 in black-and-white (in Britain, with Anna Neagle and Fernand Gravet in the leading roles). The 1940 film is much cut and rewritten, removing much of the operetta's irony. The opening and closing scenes are cut, focusing the film squarely upon the relationship between MacDonald's character, Sarah, and her music teacher, Carl Linden.  The opening scene was a flash forward, in which Sarah appears as an elderly woman recalling how she fell in love. One reason for dropping this scene is that it had been appropriated for MGM's 1937 film Maytime. Coward disliked the 1940 film and vowed that no more of his shows would be filmed in Hollywood. In 1951, he told The Daily Express, "I was saving up Bitter Sweet as an investment for my old age. After MGM's dreadful film I can never revive it" on stage.

Plot
Set in late 19th century Vienna, the story focuses on the romance between music teacher Carl Linden (Nelson Eddy) and his prize pupil Sarah Milick (Jeanette MacDonald).

Cast
 Jeanette MacDonald as Sarah Millick, later Sari Linden
 Nelson Eddy as Carl Linden
 George Sanders as Baron Von Tranisch
 Ian Hunter as Lord Shayne
 Felix Bressart as Max
 Sig Ruman as Herr Schlock
 Diana Lewis as Jane
 Lynne Carver as Dolly
 Edward Ashley as Harry Daventry
 Curt Bois as Ernst
 Fay Holden as Mrs. Millick
 Janet Beecher as Lady Daventry
 Charles Judels as Herr Wyler
 Veda Ann Borg as Manon
 Herman Bing as Market Keeper
 Greta Meyer as Mama Luden

Soundtrack
 "I'll See You Again"
 Written by Noël Coward
 Sung by Jeanette MacDonald and Nelson Eddy
 "Polka"
 Written by Noël Coward
 Played at the party and danced to by the guests
 "If You Could Only Come With Me"
 Written by Noël Coward
 Sung by Jeanette MacDonald and Nelson Eddy
 "What Is Love"
 Written by Noël Coward
 Sung by Jeanette MacDonald and Nelson Eddy
 Reprised at Schlick's
 "Kiss Me"
 Written by Noël Coward
 Sung by Jeanette MacDonald
 "Tokay"
 Written by Noël Coward
 Sung by Nelson Eddy and the patrons at the cafe
 "Love In Any Language"
 Written by Noël Coward
 Sung by Jeanette MacDonald at the cafe
 Partly dubbed by Ann Harriet Lee
 "Dear Little Cafe"
 Words and Music by Noël Coward with additional lyrics by Gus Kahn
 Sung by Jeanette MacDonald and Nelson Eddy
 Reprised by Jeanette MacDonald
 "Ladies Of The Town"
 Written by Noël Coward and Gus Kahn
 Sung by Jeanette MacDonald and 2 uncredited female singers
 "Una voce poco fa"
 From Gioacchino Rossini's The Barber of Seville
 Danced by a dancing ensemble
 "Zigeuner (The Gypsy)"
 Written by Noël Coward
 Sung by Jeanette MacDonald in the operetta finale

See also
 Bitter Sweet (1933 film)

References

External links

 
 
 
 

1940 films
1940 musical films
American musical films
Films directed by W. S. Van Dyke
Films set in the 19th century
Films set in Vienna
Films based on operettas
Films produced by Victor Saville
Films with screenplays by Lesser Samuels
Metro-Goldwyn-Mayer films
Operetta films
1940s English-language films
1940s American films